Rustichelli is a surname. Notable people with the surname include:

 Alida Rustichelli alias Alida Chelli (1943–2012), Italian actress and singer
 Carlo Rustichelli (1916–2004), Italian composer
 Dominique Rustichelli (born 1934), French soccer player

See also
 38541 Rustichelli, main-belt asteroid